Praha-Vršovice railway station is a railway station located in Prague 4, located at the edge of Vršovice and Nusle, which carried 1,826,000 passengers in 2009. The station is located on the main line from Praha hlavní nádraží to České Budějovice, and the local line to Dobříš and Čerčany via Vrané nad Vltavou.

The mainline to České Budějovice opened in 1871, beginning from what is now Praha-Hostivař railway station. On March 1, 1882, the line was extended further towards Prague to this station, which was opened under the name Nusle. The station was renamed Nusle-Vršovice in 1912, and then Praha-Vršovice in 1948. The station is classed as a cultural monument.

Vršovice station is not served by the Prague Metro, but numerous tram routes call outside the station on Vršovická street.

Services

References

Vrsovice
Railway stations opened in 1882